is a Japanese football player. He plays for Omiya Ardija.

Career
Kiichi Yajima joined FC Tokyo in 2016. On March 13, he debuted in J3 League (v SC Sagamihara).

Club statistics
Updated to 5 February 2021.

Reserves performance
Last Updated: 25 February 2019.

References

External links
Profile at FC Tokyo

1995 births
Living people
Chuo University alumni
Association football people from Tokyo
Japanese footballers
J1 League players
J2 League players
J3 League players
FC Tokyo players
FC Tokyo U-23 players
Omiya Ardija players
Association football forwards